Gem-associated protein 5 is a protein that in humans is encoded by the GEMIN5 gene.

Function 

Gem-associated protein 5 is part of the SMN a large protein complex localized to both the cytoplasm and the nucleus that plays a role in the cytoplasmic assembly of small nuclear ribonucleoproteins (snRNPs). Other members of this complex include SMN (MIM 600354), gem-associated protein 2 (SIP1; MIM 602595), GEMIN3 (DDX20; MIM 606168), and GEMIN4 (MIM 606969).

Interactions 

GEMIN5 has been shown to interact with DDX20 and SMN1.

References

Further reading